GoTV (stylized as gotv) was a 24-hour music and animation channel based in Vienna, Austria. The channel launched on 1 October 2002. The channel targets audiences in Austria, but is also widely available throughout Europe. On May 18, 2022 the owners of gotv confirmed the channel will close on June 1, 2022. The last music video on the channel was Daft Punk’s ‘One More Time’.

Background
The channel was originally a local cable-only music channel, TIV ("True Image Vision"), launched in 1996 on UPC Telekabel in Vienna. With its success, Go TV CEO Thomas Maderbacher (member of Austrian band The Wiener) became a majority stakeholder in ET Multimedia and helped to launch Go TV on 1 October 2002. It became Austria's first youth and music channel. Upon its launch, it was available to 1 million viewers and available on 50% of digital cable operators in Austria.

The channel expanded into other parts of Europe when it began to broadcast unencrypted via Astra 19.2°E on 1 May 2004. The channel generally targets German-speaking territories, mainly Austria. The channel was also available across Europe and was also available on some digital television providers in Switzerland, the Netherlands, and Germany.

Since February 2022, a number of cable operators in both Austria and Germany dropped the channel. Financial issues with supporting the channel also resulted in the channel closing.

Strategy
The channel features music from established and underground local artists, as well as music particularly from Europe and North America. The channel predominantly used the German language. The channel featured a broad music policy playing a mix of music from pop to rock, hip hop to dance, heavy metal to alternative, and everything in between. Though the channel was primarily marketed towards Austrian TV viewers, the channel was widely available throughout Europe on Astra satellite. The channel also offered viewers the latest news, events guide, competitions, music, and film promos.

On-air identity
The channel has used the same on-air identity since its launch in 2003 with some changes along the way. On-air idents were designed by Zoe Irvine. The channel's presenter an animated logo designed by Axel Stockburger. Idents change depending on the emotions of the Go TV logo.

Shows

Shows before the shutdown 
 At home
 Hosted by
 Homemade
 Play it again
 Clubnight
 Hardplay
 Neu auf go tv
 FM4 charts
 Go tv charts

Former shows
 Austrian charts
 Austrian indie chart
 Austrian long-play chart
 Austrian singles chart
 US ranking
 UK ranking
 Euro ranking
 German ranking
 Vote
 Nokia music store top 10
 Box
 Too early
 Early enough
 Made in Europe

Availability
 Austria – UPC Austria, Astra 19.2°E, Astra 1N
 Germany – Astra 19.2°E
 Switzerland – Cablecom (German-speaking region), Astra 19.2°E

References

External links
 

Television stations in Austria
Defunct television channels in Austria
Mass media in Vienna
Defunct music video networks
Television channels and stations established in 2002
Television channels and stations established in 2022
2002 establishments in Austria
2022 disestablishments in Austria
Music organisations based in Austria